The 2011 IAAF World Cross Country Championships took place on March 20, 2011.  The races were held at the Polideportivo Antonio Gil Hernández in Punta Umbría, Spain.  Reports of the event were given for the IAAF.

Preparation
The United States had expressed an interest in hosting the competition, but Punta Umbria was chosen as the host at the IAAF Council Meeting in November 2009. It will be the third occasion that Spain has hosted the competition, coming thirty years after Madrid held the 1981 edition.

The course for the competition, set in a wooded area, has a 2 km loop format with an additional 600 m section for the start and finish of each race. A number of top runners were invited to preview the course in early 2011 and all confirmed that they were pleased with its quality. Defending champion Joseph Ebuya said he liked the course but suggested that organisers add additional barriers along the route, claiming its flat features would make it difficult for runners to devise a race strategy.

Multiple world champion Kenenisa Bekele will not compete for a third year running, owing to his failure to return to fitness following a season-long calf injury.

Qualification
Athletes can gain qualification into the World Championships through performances at either their national trials or through the following IAAF Permit Meetings:

Cross de Atapuerca
Oeiras International Cross Country
Lotto Cross Cup Brussels
Great Edinburgh International Cross Country
Cross Internacional de Itálica
Antrim International Cross Country
Cinque Mulini
KCB Nairobi Cross
Chiba International Cross Country
Fukuoka International Cross Country
Eurocross
Almond Blossom Cross Country

Pre-race form

The results of the Kenyan Cross Country Championships ruled out the defending men's and women's champions (Joseph Ebuya and Emily Chebet) before the World Championships had begun: despite his strong form on the circuit that season, Ebuya dropped out of his national race, while an ankle injury prevented Chebet from gaining selection.

Unlike previous years, no former champion was present in the line-up for the men's senior event at the World Championships. This left three East African national champions as some of the foremost contenders – Kenya's Geoffrey Mutai, Hunegnaw Mesfin of Ethiopia and Ugandan runner Moses Kipsiro. Teklemariam Medhin, a young Eritrean and runner-up in 2010, had also demonstrated strong form with wins on the Spanish cross country circuit. The men's team race was also anticipated to be a battle between these four East Africa nations.

Past champions were similarly absent from the women's senior race. Linet Masai was one of principal protagonists once more, having been pipped into second place by a fellow Kenyan at both the 2009 and 2010 editions. One of her strongest rivals was yet again one of her countrywomen, this time in the form of track specialist Vivian Cheruiyot. Four-time long race bronze medallist Meselech Melkamu led the Ethiopian team, which included Genzebe Dibaba (sister of past winner Tirunesh) among its representatives. Aside from two others in the Kenyan team (Lineth Chepkurui and Pauline Korikwiang), American Shalane Flanagan and Bahrain's Maryam Yusuf Jamal were the remaining prominent names expected to challenge for the medals.

In the junior races, the foremost runner was Isaiah Koech, who had set world junior indoor bests on the track in the months preceding the competition. A victory at the Kenyan junior race established him as a contender for the cross country title. Although the Kenyan junior women team did not have a star name, it was favoured to defend its team title against the Ethiopian challengers in an event at which the country is traditionally strong.

Schedule

Results

Senior men's race (12 km)
Complete results for senior men, for senior men's teams, were published.

Note: Athletes in parentheses did not score for the team result.

Senior women's race (8 km)
Complete results for senior women, and for senior women's teams were published.

Note: Athletes in parentheses did not score for the team result.

Junior men's race (8 km)
Complete results for junior men and for junior men's teams were published.

Note: Athletes in parentheses did not score for the team result.

Junior women's race (6 km)
Complete results for junior women and for junior women's teams were published.

Note: Athletes in parentheses did not score for the team result.

Medal table (unofficial)

Note: Totals include both individual and team medals, with medals in the team competition counting as one medal.

Participation
According to an unofficial count, 423 athletes from 51 countries participated. This is in agreement with the official numbers as published.

 (16)
 (1)
 (2)
 (15)
 (13)
 (2)
 (1)
 (4)
 (12)
 (2)
 (18)
 (1)
 (1)
 (3)
 (1)
 (1)
 (20)
 (24)
 (9)
 (1)
 (3)
 (1)
 (11)
 (22)
 (2)
 (24)
 (2)
 (3)
 (22)
 (6)
 (5)
 (5)
 (2)
 (14)
 (1)
 (6)
 (4)
 (3)
 (1)
 (23)
 (24)
 (4)
 (2)
 (1)
 (14)
 (19)
 (2)
 (24)
 (24)
 (1)
 (1)

See also
 2011 IAAF World Cross Country Championships – Senior men's race
 2011 IAAF World Cross Country Championships – Junior men's race
 2011 IAAF World Cross Country Championships – Senior women's race
 2011 IAAF World Cross Country Championships – Junior women's race
 2011 in athletics (track and field)

References

External links 
 Official website
 IAAF competition website

 
World Athletics Cross Country Championships
World Cross Country
International athletics competitions hosted by Spain
IAAF
Cross country running in Spain